Hickinbotham is a surname. Notable people with the surname include:

 Alan Hickinbotham (1925–2010), Australian rules footballer and businessman
 David Hickinbotham (1862–1941), Australian rules footballer
 Hickinbotham Brothers Shipbuilders, California shipbuilder
 Hickinbotham Oval, in Adelaide

See also
 Higginbotham, surname